Raúl Navas may refer to:
Raúl Navas (footballer, born 1978), Spanish football goalkeeper
Raúl Navas (footballer, born 1988), Spanish football defender

See also
Raúl Nava (born 1990), Mexican football forward